The Advances for Public Works Act 1840 was an Act to provide the necessary  authorization for the provision of money ( Exchequer bills) to further  Public Works and for the Employment of the Poor.

See also
 Welfare
 Welfare state
 Office of Public Works
 Egyptian Public Works
 Department of Public Works (Kerala)
 List of Acts of the Parliament of the United Kingdom, 1840–1859

References

External links 
© UK Parliament Retrieved 2011-11-27 - transcript of an 1840 meeting held in the Houses of Parliament (England)

United Kingdom Acts of Parliament 1840